Edward Joseph Hunkeler (January 1, 1894 – October 1, 1970) was an American prelate of the Roman Catholic Church who served as bishop of the Diocese of Grand Island, Nebraska (1945–1951), and Bishop and Archbishop of the Archdiocese of Kansas City, Kansas (1951–1969).

Biography

Early life 
Edward Hunkeler was born in Medicine Lodge, Kansas, to Anton and Philomena (née Durst) Hunkeler. He and his parents later moved to Dayton, Ohio, where he attended the parochial school of Holy Trinity Parish.  He later enrolled at the University of Dayton. Hunkeler completed his studies for the priesthood at the Pontifical College Josephinum in Worthington.

Priesthood 
Hunkeler was ordained to the priesthood by Bishop James Hartley on June 14, 1919, for the Diocese of Omaha.Hunkeler served as pastor of Saints Philip and James Parish in Wynot, Nebraska until 1927, when he was transferred to Blessed Sacrament Parish in Omaha. In 1936, Hunkeler was appointed rector of St. Cecilia Cathedral in Omaha.  He was named a domestic prelate by Pope Pius XI in 1937, and became vicar general of the diocese in 1944.

Bishop of Grand Island 
On March 19, 1945, Hunkeler was appointed the third bishop of the Diocese of Grand Island by Pope Pius XII.  He received his episcopal consecration on May 1, 1945, from Archbishop Amleto Cicognani, with Bishops James Ryan and Stanislaus Bona serving as co-consecrators, at St. Cecilia Cathedral. During his tenure in Grand Island, Hunkeler ordained 16 priests, and oversaw a large increase in the construction of new churches and other religious institutions in the post-World War II era.

Bishop and Archbishop of Kansas City 
Hunkeler was named Bishop of Kansas City by Pius XII on March 28, 1951. When the Diocese of Kansas City was elevated to the rank of an archdiocese on August 9, 1952, Hunkeler became its first archbishop. He attended all four sessions in Rome of the Second Vatican Council.

Retirement and legacy 
On September 10, 1969, Pope Paul VI accepted Hunkeler's resignation as archbishop due to health problems.  In 1970, while returning from the installation of Bishop Kenneth Povish, Hunkeler's car was involved in an automobile accident near Crookston, Minnesota. Edward Hunkeler died two days later, on October 1, at age 76; his death was ascribed to a cardiovascular respiratory condition rather than to injuries sustained in the accident.

References

 

1894 births
1970 deaths
20th-century Roman Catholic archbishops in the United States
Participants in the Second Vatican Council
People from Medicine Lodge, Kansas
Roman Catholic Archdiocese of Omaha
Roman Catholic bishops of Grand Island
Roman Catholic bishops of Kansas City in Kansas
Roman Catholic archbishops of Kansas City in Kansas